In Spain, apart from the Central Administration, the central government has a Peripheral Administration. This administration is composed of all those decentralized government services, and they are coordinated by the Government Delegations, which are headquartered in the Spanish regions' capitals. Likewise, this delegations exercise its powers through sub-delegations, headquartered in the provinces and insular directorates, heardquartered in some islands. In total, there are 19 government delegations, 44 sub-delegations and 7 insular directorates.

The government delegations were established pursuant Section 154 of the Spanish Constitution and grants to them the task of direct the Government Administration in the regions as well as to direct the regional administration when necessary. The sub-delegations and insular directorates were extended to the national territory in 1997 although it already existed since the 1970s. Their task is to assist the Government Delegate. All of them are part of the Ministry of Territorial Policy and Civil Service.

Delegations and sub-delegations
Both entities are regulated in the Legal Regime of the Public Sector Act of 2015.

Government Delegation 
The Government Delegations or Delegations of the Government are the bodies that represents the central government in the autonomous communities. The Government Delegates have the rank of Under Secretaries and they report to the Prime Minister, although normally this competence is delegated into the Minister for Territorial Policy or, the Secretary of State for Territorial Policy. They are appointed by the Council of Ministers at the request of the Premier. If the office of Delegate is vacant, they are replaced by the Sub-delegate until a new Delegate is appointed. In the regions with a sole province, if there is not sub-delegate is the Secretary-General of the delegation who temporary assumes the office.

Unlike the sub-delegations and insular directorates, the Delegations are constitutionally provided. The main tasks of the delegations are:

 To coordinate the General State Administration services and public bodies in the region.
 To inform the citizents about the government activities in the region.
 To coordinate the government departments with other public administrations.
 To guarantee the correct application of the norms and laws and the respect for the powers of the central government.
 To propose measures to the Ministry responsible in order to avoid the inefficiency of the administration and the duplicity of public bodies.
It is up to the Government Delegates to protect the free exercise of the constitutional rights and freedoms and to guarantee public security, through the Government Sub-delegates and the State Security Forces and Corps. For this purpose, the Delegate is the head of the state law enforcement agencies in the region.

Government Sub-delegation 
The Government Sub-delegations or Sub-delegations of the Government are bodies that represents the central government in the Spanish provinces. The Sub-delegations were created by the 1997 General State Administration Organization and Functioning Act to replace the Civil Governors. It exists a Sub-delegate of the Government in each province under the authority of the regional-level Government Delegate. They are appointed by the Delegate from career civil servants and they exercise the same powers of the Delegate but a provincial level.

In the single-province autonomous communities and in the autonomous cities, as a general rule, the Government Delegate assumes the powers that the Law attributes to the Government Sub-delegates in the provinces. These regions are Asturias, Balearic Islands, Cantabria, Ceuta, Melilla, Murcia, Navarre and La Rioja. In Madrid, since 2003, because of its importance as the capital of the Kingdom and despite being a single-province region, there is both Delegate and Sub-Delegate of the Government.

Current delegations and sub-delegations 
As of October 2022:

Insular Directorates

According to Section 70 of the Legal Regime of the Public Sector Act, the existence of Insular Directors is not mandatory. When they exist, they are freely appointed by the Government Delegate among civil servants and they depend directly from the Delegate or the Sub-delegate if exists. Their official title is Insular Directors of the General State Administration and they possess the same powers as a subdelegate.

Collective assistance bodies 
In order to assist the Government Delegates, there are two kind of collective bodies. The first kind are to Government Delegations which powers extend in more than one province, while the second is for one-province delegations. The Sub-delegates also have an assistance bodies and there is a nation-wide committee to coordinate all Delegations.

More-than-one province 
These bodies are chaired by the Delegate of the Government and integrated by the Sub-delegates of the Government of the provinces of its jurisdiction and the heads of the other departments and agencies of the Delegation. They exist to coordinate the actions of the different bodies, to homogenize the policies, to advise the Delegate of the Government and to discuss any other matter that the Delegate considers relevant.

Single province delegation 
In the single-province Autonomous Communities, it exists an assistance body chaired by the Delegate of the Government and integrated by the Secretary-General of the Delegation (who runs day-to-day the Delegation) and the heads of the other departments and agencies of the Delegation.

Government Sub-delegations 
In each Sub-delegation of the Government it exist an assistance committee to the Sub-delegate integrated by the Secretary-General of the Sub-delegation and the heads of the other departments and services of the Sub-delegation. They do the same duties as the other assistance bodies but at a provincial level.

Interministerial Coordination Committee on the State Peripheral Administration 
The Interministerial Coordination Committee on the State Peripheral Administration is a body of the Ministry of Territorial Policy and Civil Service chaired by the Minister and integrated by the Secretary of State for Territorial Policy (deputy chair), the Secretary-General for Territorial Coordination, all the Under Secretaries of the government departments, all the Delegates of the Government and the Director-General for Internal Policy. To the meetings of the committee also assists the Deputy Director-General for the Boost of Peripheral Administration which acts as Secretary of the Committee and other senior officials of the Administrations invited by the chair.

The Committee is in charge to improve the coordination of the central government Peripheral Administration, to boos the share of information, to establish a unique criteria of action and to discuss relevant issues for the government policy in the regions.

References

Government of Spain
Public Administration of Spain